Denis Sergeyevich Dmitriev (born 23 March 1986) is a Russian track cyclist. Specialising in the sprint events, Dmitriev's best result in international sports was winning a gold medal at the 2017 World Championships in Hong Kong. At the 2016 Summer Olympics he succeeded to the bronze medal race in sprint, winning the medal. Dmitriev is a four-time European Champion at senior level in the Sprint event for men, and the most successful sprint cyclist in the competitions's history.

Major results

2003
 2003 UCI Juniors Track World Championships
 2nd Team Sprint
 2003 European Junior Track Championships
 2nd Team Sprint

2004
 2004 European Junior Track Championships
 1st  Team sprint,

2006
 2006 European under-23 Track Championships
 3rd Team Sprint,

2008
 2008 European under-23 Track Championships
 1st  Team sprint

2010
 2010 UEC European Track Championships
 1st  Sprint,

2011
 2011 UEC European Track Championships
 3rd Sprint
 2011 Russian National Championship,
 1st  Keirin
 1st  Team Sprint
 1st  Sprint

2012
 2012 UEC European Track Championships
 1st  Sprint
 3rd Keirin

2013
 2013 UCI Track Cycling World Championships
 2nd Sprint
 2013 UEC European Track Championships
 1st  Sprint
 3rd Team Sprint
 2013 Russian National Championship
 1st  Keirin
 1st  Sprint
 2nd Team Sprint

2014
 2014 UCI Track Cycling World Championships
 3rd Sprint
 2014 UEC European Track Championships
 3rd Team Sprint
 3rd Keirin

2015
 2015 UCI Track Cycling World Championships
 3rd Keirin
 2nd Sprint

2016
 2016 UCI Track Cycling World Championships
 2nd Sprint

2017
 2017 UCI Track Cycling World Championships
 1st  Sprint
 2017 UEC European Track Championships
 3rd Sprint

2018
 2018 Russian National Championship,
 1st  Sprint
 1st  Team Sprint

2019
 2019 UCI Track Cycling World Championships
 3rd Team Sprint
 2019 European Games
 3rd Keirin
 3rd Sprint
 2019 UEC European Track Championships
 2nd Keirin

2020
 2020 UEC European Track Championships
 1st  Sprint
 2nd Keirin
 2nd Sprint

References

External links

1986 births
Living people
People from Pronsky District
Russian male cyclists
Olympic cyclists of Russia
Cyclists at the 2008 Summer Olympics
Cyclists at the 2012 Summer Olympics
Cyclists at the 2016 Summer Olympics
Cyclists at the 2020 Summer Olympics
Olympic medalists in cycling
Olympic bronze medalists for Russia
Medalists at the 2016 Summer Olympics
UCI Track Cycling World Champions (men)
Universiade medalists in cycling
Russian track cyclists
Universiade gold medalists for Russia
Cyclists at the 2019 European Games
European Games medalists in cycling
European Games bronze medalists for Russia
Sportspeople from Ryazan Oblast
Medalists at the 2011 Summer Universiade